George Washington LeCato (August 1, 1842 – March 12, 1903) was an American politician who served as a member of the Virginia Senate.

References

External links
 
 

1842 births
1903 deaths
Democratic Party Virginia state senators
19th-century American politicians
20th-century American politicians